Karolina Koszewska, née Łukasik (born 7 January 1982) is a Polish boxer. She competed in the women's welterweight event at the 2020 Summer Olympics.

References

External links
 

1982 births
Living people
Polish women boxers
Southpaw boxers
Olympic boxers of Poland
Boxers at the 2020 Summer Olympics
Boxers from Warsaw
Boxers at the 2019 European Games
European Games medalists in boxing
European Games gold medalists for Poland
20th-century Polish women
21st-century Polish women